The Edward R. Murrow Award for Outstanding Contributions to Public Radio is a journalism award given by the Corporation for Public Broadcasting annually since 1977.

Recipients
 1977, Burton D. Harrison
 1978, Donald R. Quayle
 1979, Albert L. Hulsen
 1980, Susan Stamberg
 1981, William H. Kling
 1982, Ronald C. Bornstein
 1983, Samuel C.O. Holt
 1984, Bob Edwards
 1985, Garrison Keillor
 1986, William H. Siemering
 1987, Thomas J. Thomas and Theresa R. Clifford
 1988, Joe N. Gwathmey
 1989, Leo C. Lee
 1990, Cokie Roberts
 1991, E. Wayne Bundy
 1992, Kenneth N. Dayton
 1993, Douglas J. Bennet
 1994, Tom Church and David Giovannoni
 1995,  Lynn Chadwick 
 1996, Jay Allison
 1997, William Buzenberg
 1998, Jack W. Mitchell
 1999,  Hugo Morales
 2000, Jane Christo
 2001, Richard H. Madden
 2002, Peter J. Loewenstein
 2003, Terry Gross
 2004, Anne Garrels
 2005, Wayne C. Roth
 2006, Kevin Klose
 2007, Dave Isay
 2008, Laura R. Walker
 2009, Ira Glass
 2010, Nina Totenberg
 2011, Lourdes Garcia-Navarro
 2012, (no award)
 2013, (no award)
 2014, (no award)
 2015, Ofeibea Quist-Arcton, David Gilkey

External links 
 CPB: Edward R. Murrow Award

Murrow Award, Edward R.